Echinanthera cephalomaculata  is a species of snake of the family Colubridae. The holotype (a female) measured .

Distribution 
The species is endemic to the northeast of Brazil.

References

Echinanthera
Endemic fauna of Brazil
Reptiles of Brazil
Reptiles described in 1994